Khunabad (also Romanized as Khūnābād; also known as Ḩoseynābād) is a village in Kakhk Rural District, Kakhk District, Gonabad County, Razavi Khorasan Province, Iran. At the 2006 census, its population was 59, in 22 families.

References 

Populated places in Gonabad County